Street Dogs is the fifth album by the Street Dogs. It was released on August 31, 2010. The band recorded the album at the Blasting Room in February 2010. The track "Rattle and Roll" was released on the compilation Epitaph New Noise, Volume 1. The album includes a re-recording of "Fighter", one of the band's most popular songs from their debut album, Savin Hill. This was the final album to feature Paul Rucker on Drums.

Track listing

Personnel
Mike McColgan – vocals
Johnny Rioux – bass
Marcus Hollar – lead guitar
Tobe Bean III – rhythm guitar
Paul Rucker – drums

References

Street Dogs albums
2010 albums
Hellcat Records albums